Guy Robert Daniel Texier (19 February 1930 – 18 January 2017) was a French rower. He competed in the men's coxed four event at the 1952 Summer Olympics.

References

1930 births
2017 deaths
French male rowers
Olympic rowers of France
Rowers at the 1952 Summer Olympics